Keith Carmody is an Irish hurler who plays as a left-wing-back for the Kerry senior team.

Born in Causeway, County Kerry, Carmody first played competitive hurling during his schooling at Causeway Comprehensive School. He arrived on the inter-county scene at the age of sixteen when he first linked up with the Kerry minor team before later joining the under-21 side. He made his senior debut during the 2014 league. Carmody quickly became a regular member of the starting fifteen and has won one Christy Ring Cup medal, at the end of the year he picked up a Christy Ring All-Star and Christy Ring Player of the Year for 2015  

He was part of the Under 21 Hurling/Shinty International team in 2015. He also captained Ireland to victory in the Under 21 Hurling/Shinty International in 2016.

At the club level, Carmody plays with Causeway.

Honours

Team

Kerry
Christy Ring Cup (1): 2015
Christy Ring All Star (1): 2015
Christy Ring Player of the Year (1): 2015
National League (Division 2A) (2): 2014, 2015
All-Ireland Under 21 B Hurling Championship (1): 2013
All-Ireland Minor B Hurling Championship (2): 2012, 2013

Causeway
Kerry Senior Hurling Championship (2): 2019, 2022
Kerry Under-21 hurling championship (2): 2014,  2015

References

1995 births
Living people
Causeway hurlers
Kerry inter-county hurlers